Wylie Road is a road in Ho Man Tin and King's Park, Kowloon, Hong Kong. It runs south–north from Gascoigne Road to Waterloo Road and was named after the British missionary Alexander Wylie.

Notable places
British Military Hospital
 
Tung Wah College

See also
List of streets and roads in Kowloon

References

Roads in Kowloon
Ho Man Tin